Sverker John Olof  Göranson (born 3 May 1954) is a Swedish Army general with an armoured forces background. In 1995, he was the chief of staff of the Nordic battalion within UNPROFOR in Bosnia and Herzegovina during the Yugoslav Wars. Göranson was Inspector of the Swedish Army from 2005 to 2007, and served as Chief of Defence Staff from 2007 to 2009. He was the Supreme Commander of the Swedish Armed Forces from 25 March 2009, when he succeeded Håkan Syrén, until 1 October 2015, when he was succeeded by Micael Bydén.

Career
Göranson was born in Lund, Sweden, the son of Sven-Eric Göranson, a Natural science teacher, school leader and principal at Komvux, and Margit, a language teacher (1921–2005). He soon moved with his parents to Kristianstad. He graduated from Österängsskolan in 1973, which followed by technical high school in Hässleholm before enrolling at Chalmers University of Technology in Gothenburg in 1974. There he studied pedagogic, psychology and sociology and graduated in 1975 with a college examina in engineering. In June 1974 he started his mandatory conscription and served as a platoon leader at North Scanian Regiment (P 6) in his hometown of Kristianstad, followed by the Swedish Armoured Troops Cadet and Officer Candidate School (PKAS) at Göta Life Guards (P 1) in Enköping.

Career
He enrolled at the Military Academy Karlberg in 1975 and graduated in 1977, finishing first in his class. Göranson was commissioned as 1st Lieutenant and served as a main battle tanks instructor. Göranson was promoted to captain in 1980 and passed the Basic Course at the Swedish Armed Forces Staff College from 1983 to 1984, when he was promoted to major. He then passed the General Staff Course at the Swedish Armed Forces Staff College from 1985 to 1987, finishing first in his class. Göranson served as a staff officer at the Southern Military Area (Milo S) from 1987 to 1989 and then as a staff officer at the Swedish Armed Forces Headquarters Staff for Joint Operations (Operationsledningen, OPL) from 1989 to 1991. In 1990 he passed the 31st Military Course on Law of Armed Conflicts and the Basic Course at the Swedish National Defence College.

From 1991 to 1993 Göranson was Deputy Project Manager, Tactical Evaluation of the main battle tank for the Swedish Army and was promoted to lieutenant colonel. He attended the United States Army Command and General Staff College at Fort Leavenworth in Kansas, United States from 1993 to 1994 where he was one of the foremost among the foreign students. Göranson was later inducted into the Fort Leavenworth International Hall of Fame in 2008. Göranson passed the UN Staff Officer Course in 1994 and was a senior teacher of army tactics at the Swedish Armed Forces Staff College from 1994 to 1995. Göranson was then chief of staff of the Nordic Battalion 2 (Nordbat 2)/BA 05 in the United Nations Protection Force (UNPROFOR) in Bosnia and Herzegovina late 1995. In early 1996 he was deputy battalion commander of Swebat in the Implementation Force (IFOR) in Bosnia and Herzegovina. Back in Sweden, he was deputy brigade commander of Southern Scania Brigade (Södra skånska brigaden, MekB 7) from 1996 to 1997 when he was promoted to colonel.

Göranson was brigade commander of the Life Guards Brigade (Livgardesbrigaden) in Stockholm from 1997 to 2000 and did the Senior Level Leadership Management Course in 1998/1999. He was military and assistant defence attaché to the United States from 2000 to 2003 when he was promoted to brigadier general. Göranson did the Civilian/Military Command Course Senior Level in 2003 and was then assistant chief for defence planning and operations at the Swedish Armed Forces Headquarters from 2003 to 2005. In 2004 he did the Danish Chief of Defence Security Policy Course and from 2005 to 2007 he served as Inspector of the Swedish Army. Göranson served as Chief of Defence Staff and Chief of Staff of the Armed Forces (Försvarsmaktens stabschef) from 2007 to 2009 before being appointed Supreme Commander of the Swedish Armed Forces on 6 March 2009. He took office of 25 March 2009. Göranson was Supreme Commander of the Swedish Armed Forces for 6 years before he was succeeded by Micael Bydén on 1 October 2015.

Post-retirement
From 1 April 2016 Göranson worked with a group of advisors to the Saab Group in the United States and on 18 May 2016 he became a board member of Invidzonen, an organization for relatives of Swedish personnel employed by the Swedish Armed Forces and the police force serving abroad. On 1 March 2017 he became chairman of the board of the Nordic Travel Group. On 9 March 2017 Göranson, together with Ari Puheloinen, was awarded the "2017 Promoter of the Year of Relations Between Sweden and Finland" by the Sweden-Finland Society (Samfundet Sverige-Finland). On 27 March 2017 Göranson was elected chairman of the Swedish Veterans Association (Sveriges Veteranförbund). He is also a board member of the chemical intelligence company Serstech AB. In 2018, Göranson was elected president of the Royal Swedish Academy of War Sciences.

Personal life
In 1976 he married Ann (born 1955) and they have two children (daughter born 1983, son born 1985).

Dates of rank
Göranson's promotions:

1977 – Lieutenant
1980 – Captain
1984 – Major
1993 – Lieutenant Colonel
1997 – Colonel
2003 – Brigadier General
2005 – Major General
2007 – Lieutenant General
2009 – General

Awards and decorations

Göranson's decorations:

Swedish
   H. M. The King's Medal, 12th size gold medal with chain (2016)
   For Zealous and Devoted Service of the Realm
   Swedish Armed Forces Conscript Medal
   Swedish Armed Forces International Service Medal
   Home Guard Medal of Merit
   North Scanian Regiment Commemorative Medal (Norra skånska regementets minnesmedalj)
   Swedish Reserve Officers Federation Merit Badge (Förbundet Sveriges Reservofficerares förtjänsttecken)
   Old Comrades Alliance of the Swedish Korea Ambulance Cross of Remembrance and Merit
   Life Guards Dragoons Medal of Merit
   Life Guards Medal of Merit
  Katanga Cross (Katangakorset), UN Veterans Congo's honorary pin

Foreign
   Grand Cross of the Order of the Lion of Finland (2013)
   Commander with star of the Royal Norwegian Order of Merit (2 March 2012)
   Gold Cross of Honour of the Bundeswehr
   Commander of the Legion of Honour
   Commander of the Legion of Merit (2005)
   Officer of the Legion of Merit (2003)
   Knight Commander's Cross of the Order of Merit of the Federal Republic of Germany (2014)
   United Nations Medal in bronze (UNPROFOR)
   NATO Medal (IFOR)
   Italian CHOD Order of Merit for International Operations (Medaglia d'onore interforze dello Stato Maggiore Difesa)
  Finnish Freedom Fighters' Blue Cross
  United States Army Command and General Staff Officer Course Badge

Honours
Member of the Royal Swedish Academy of War Sciences (2002)
President of the Royal Swedish Academy of War Sciences (2018–2022)
Member of the International Hall of Fame at the United States Army Command and General Staff College (2008)
Honorary Subaltern of the Life Guards (2008)

References

1954 births
Living people
Swedish Army generals
Chiefs of Army (Sweden)
United States Army Command and General Staff College alumni
People from Lund
Members of the Royal Swedish Academy of War Sciences
Commanders of the Legion of Merit
Commandeurs of the Légion d'honneur
Recipients of the Badge of Honour of the Bundeswehr
Commanders Grand Cross of the Order of the Lion of Finland
Knights Commander of the Order of Merit of the Federal Republic of Germany
Swedish military attachés